The Giant Schnauzer is a breed of dog developed in the 17th century in Germany. It is the largest of the three breeds of Schnauzerthe other two breeds being the Standard Schnauzer and the Miniature Schnauzer. Numerous breeds were used in its development, including the black Great Dane, the Bouvier des Flandres, and the German Pinscher. Originally bred to assist on farms by driving livestock to market and guarding the farmer's property, the breed eventually moved into the city, where it worked guarding breweries, butchers' shops, stockyards and factories. It was unknown outside of Bavaria until it became popular as a military dog during World War I and World War II.

They have a dense coarse coat that protects them from the weather and from vermin. Giant Schnauzers come in three color varieties: pepper and salt, pure black with black undercoat, and black and silver. Where legal, they are shown with cropped ears and docked tails. Like other schnauzers, they have a distinct beard and eyebrows. Today, the Giant Schnauzer participates in numerous dog sports, including Schutzhund. Another sport that the dog excels in is that of nosework. Due to its alert nature, the dog is also used in police work.

History
The first Giant Schnauzers emerged from Swabia in the German state of Bavaria, and Württemberg in the 17th century. These original Giant Schnauzers were considered a rough-coated version of the German Pinscher breeds, and their hair was thought to help them withstand the harsh German winters and bites from vermin. The origins of the breed are unclear, but sources speculate it originated through some combination of black Great Danes, German Shepherds, Rottweilers, Dobermanns, Boxers, Bouvier des Flandres, Thuringian Shepherds, and the Standard Schnauzer.

The Giant Schnauzer was originally bred as a multipurpose farm dog for guarding property and driving animals to market. By the turn of the 20th century the Giant Schnauzer was being used as a watchdog at factories, breweries, butcheries, and stockyards throughout Bavaria. It was unknown outside Bavaria until it was used as a military dog in World War I and World War II. The first Giant Schnauzers were imported to America in the 1930s, but they remained rare until the 1960s, when the breed became popular. In 1962, there were 23 new Giant Schnauzers registered with the American Kennel Club; in 1974 this number was 386; in 1984 it was over 800 and in 1987 it was around 1000 animals. In 2012, there were 94 new dogs registered, down from 95 in 2011.

In modern times, the Giant Schnauzer is used as a police dog; is trained for obedience, dog agility, herding, search and rescue, and schutzhund; and is shown in conformation shows. They are also used for carting. In Europe, the breed is considered to be more of a working dog than a show dog. The focus in many European Schnauzer clubs is not so much on conformation shows, but on the working ability of the breed. In several countries, including Germany, dogs must achieve a Schutzhund Champion title before they can qualify to be a conformation champion.

Description

Appearance

Although the Giant Schnauzer is called 'Giant', this is not in comparison to other large dog breeds such as the Great Dane or the Rottweiler, but instead in comparison to the Standard and Miniature Schnauzers. Giant Schnauzers are square in shape, and should resemble a larger version of the Standard Schnauzer. The tail is long and the ears are small button ears carried high on the head. Where it is legal, it is possibly docked and the ears cropped.

The head is  the length of the dog's back, when the back is measured from the withers to the base of the tail. The cheeks are flat, but well muscled. The coat is dense, wiry, and weather resistant. The fur on the Giant Schnauzer's face forms a distinct "beard" and eyebrows. Its stride is long and crisp.

Temperament

Giant Schnauzers are usually a quiet breed. Due to its breeding, the Giant Schnauzer is inherently suspicious of strangers and can be very territorial. Once introduced, it is usually accepting of novel people or situations. It has the potential to be aggressive, but Giant Schnauzers are usually reserved – they are "amiable in repose, and a commanding figure when aroused".

Giant Schnauzers have been described as trustworthy with children. They are very intelligent, and can become bored easily. They are also very energetic and highly spirited, which, when coupled with boredom, can lead to unwanted and destructive behavior. They are easily trained, and deeply loyal to their owner. They are known to become highly imprinted to their owners. Some breeders believe that pepper and salt colored Giant Schnauzers are more docile than their black-furred counterparts.

Health

Giant Schnauzers require regular grooming. Their beard can collect drool and food particles, making frequent cleanings essential. If being shown, their coat needs to be stripped every two to four weeks. If they are simply a companion animal, the coat can be clipped instead. Some Giant Schnauzers have an allergy to shampoo.

Hip and elbow dysplasia are common. Giant Schnauzers are also prone to eye problems such as keratoconjunctivitis sicca, glaucoma, cataracts, multifocal retinal dysplasia, and generalized progressive retinal atrophy. They are also prone to skin diseases, such as seasonal flank alopecia, vitiligo, and follicular cysts. Cancer of the skin is common in dark-colored dogs, with the most frequently occurring varieties being melanoma of the limbs and digits, and squamous cell carcinoma of the digit. This susceptibility occurs because melanoma is caused by a defect in the melanocytes, the cells that darken the color of the skin. Noncancerous skin tumors are also common.

Some Giant Schnauzers develop central diabetes insipidus, autosomal recessive hypothyroidism, selective malabsorption of cobalamin, narcolepsy, cataplexy, and various seizure disorders. Some are also sensitive to sulphonamides and gold. Bone diseases and joint problems are also an issue. The most common causes of death in Giant Schnauzers are lymphoma and liver cancer, followed by heart attacks and heart failure.

See also 
 Black Russian Terrier

References

External links

Dog breeds originating in Germany
FCI breeds

de:Schnauzer#Riesenschnauzer